Aida DiPace Donald is an American editor and historian.

She worked as an editor at the Harvard University Press for 27 years, focusing for years on history and social science books, and eventually rising to the position of editor-in-chief. She worked with writers like Lawrence Tribe, and translators like Arthur Goldhammer. Though no women have held the directorship, Donald was one of few women to lead significant parts of the Press. She also taught at Columbia University.

She was married to historian David Donald from 1955 until his death in 2009. They had one son, computer scientist Bruce Donald. She earned her PhD at the University of Rochester, studying 19th century American history.

Books 

 Prelude to Civil War: The decline of the Whig party in New York, 1848-1852 (dissertation, 1961)
 Diary of Charles Francis Adams (edited, 1964)
 John F. Kennedy and the New Frontier (edited, 1968)
 Lion in the White House: A Life of Theodore Roosevelt (2007)
 Citizen Soldier: A Life of Harry S. Truman (2012)

References 

1930s births
Living people
Women in publishing
Harvard University Press
Barnard College alumni
Writers from New York City
Harvard University administrators
21st-century American women writers
American women historians
20th-century American women writers
American book editors
Women print editors
Columbia University faculty
Historians of the United States
Political historians
Columbia University alumni
University of Rochester alumni
American biographers